Sailaab is an Indian television series that was directed by Ravi Rai and was broadcast on Zee TV from 1995 to 1998. The show starred actors Sachin Khedekar and Renuka Shahane in lead roles and gained popularity due to its fresh take on relationships.

Plot 
Shivani (Renuka Shahane) and Rohit (Sachin Khedekar) love each other. However, Rohit is not professionally established. Shivani's guardian, her older brother, does not approve of their relationship and arranges her marriage with someone else, emotionally blackmailing her to comply.   When the former lovers meet after a few years, both are married to other people. Their love for each other is as strong as ever, and they start seeing each other often, though in a platonic way.

Cast 
 Renuka Shahane as Shivani
 Sachin Khedekar as Rohit
 Prajakti Deshmukh as Gayatri
 Ajinkya Deo as Avinash
 Mahesh Thakur as Avinash (later)
 Raju Kher as Shivani's elder brother
 Suchita Trivedi
 Ninad Kamat as Ashish
 Raviraj Kande as Yashwant Lamture

Music 
The title track is called Apni Marzi Se. It was based on a poem by poet Nida Fazli. Composed by Talat Aziz and sung by renowned ghazal singer, Jagjit Singh, the title track became very popular.

References 

Zee TV original programming
1995 Indian television series debuts
1998 Indian television series endings